Sir Richard Mayne (1796–1868) was a British barrister and joint first Commissioner of the London Metropolitan Police.

Richard Mayne may also refer to:
Richard Mayne (MP), English Member of Parliament for Bridgwater, 1386–1388
Richard Mayne (explorer) (1835–1892), British Royal Navy admiral, son of the police commissioner
Richard Mayne (administrator) (1926–2009), British advocate of European integration and writer